Blue board may refer to:
Computing
 Blue Board (software) Commodore Bulletin Board system from the 1980s
European waterways
 Blue sign used by vessels indicating an intention to pass on the non-standard side in Europe